Iberia is an unincorporated community in Brown County, in the U.S. state of Minnesota.

History
A post office was established at Iberia in 1870, and remained in operation until it was discontinued in 1893. The community was named after the Iberian Peninsula.

References

Unincorporated communities in Brown County, Minnesota
Unincorporated communities in Minnesota